Columbus Park may refer to:

Christopher Columbus Waterfront Park in Boston, Massachusetts
Columbus Park (Brooklyn) at the southern end of Cadman Plaza
Columbus Park (Buffalo), New York
Columbus Park (Chicago), Illinois, listed on the National Register of Historic Places
Columbus Park (Hoboken, New Jersey)
Columbus Park (Jamaica)
Columbus Park (Manhattan), New York